Bhutta Village is a village in Karachi, Pakistan, which is near Keamari and the Karachi Port.

History
Bhutta Village is an old town. It was once covered with sea and mangroves, then later on the mangroves were cut off and sea was filled with sand to make it a residential area.
It was formerly called Jungleabad because of the large number of mangroves trees that once used to be over here.

This is quite old area and lies in neighbourhood of Shirin Jinnah Colony. 
There are several different caste living over here including Pathans and Kutchi that makes up to 90% population of is town. Other peoples are Punjabi Arain, Sindhi, Hazara and now growing population of Balochi peoples who are migrating from Lyari Town because of a Gang War Operation.

Sports
Bhutta Village is a sportive town of Karachi. It has teams from football and cricket as these two games are most played overall the Pakistan.
Bhutta Village has two famous football clubs including Keamari Mohammadan the oldest club of Pakistan, formed around 1902 during the time of British India it is a semi-professional football club having winning almost every trophy in 70s, 80s and 90s. It is the most successful club in the history of Keamari Town. The other team in Bhutta Mohammadan.

References

External links 
 Karachi Website.
 Kemari Town.

Neighbourhoods of Karachi
Kiamari Town